Evidence is the fifth studio album by South African rock band Prime Circle. It was released November 12, 2012. The album was licensed through EMI Music South Africa for that country. Internationally other specialised labels were selected to distribute the album. It is the follow up to the album Jekyll & Hyde (2010). The album was recorded in Cape Town, South Africa between the months of February and June, 2012. Evidence was officially announced in June, 2012 via the band's official Facebook page and website.

Style and Lyrics
Lead singer-songwriter and guitarist Ross Learmonth stated in an interview that the album was about trying to let go of something when "evidence" of it is left behind. Lyrically the album stays consistent with that of the previous releases. The lyrics focus mainly on the breakdowns of relationships from a positive perspective. The lyrics also deal with themes such as, innocence, changes, taking things for granted, isolation, and belonging. Stylistically the album draws from previous releases such as Jekyll & Hyde (2010) with darker tone songs such as "Evidence". The album also incorporates rock ballads such as "Written in Riddles" and "Know You Better" similar to those from All or Nothing (2008) and Live This Life (2005).

Singles
"Time Kills Us All" was released as the album's first single. It made its debut on radio stations across South Africa in October, 2012. A music video for the track was released in June 2013. The video was filmed in Cape Town, South Africa and focused on the end of the world as the main theme. Following the success of "Time Kills Us All" the band released their second single, the title track "Evidence". The second single was released in January, 2013. The single was accompanied by the release of the music video for the song. The video dealt with themes such as interrogation, isolation, accusation, and events from the past affecting the present.

Track listing

Personnel
 Ross Learmoth - vocals, rhythm guitar, Acoustic guitar, songwriter
 Marco Gomes - bass, songwriter
 Dale Schnettler - drums, backing vocals, Acoustic guitar, percussion, songwriter
 Dirk Bisschoff - lead guitar, Acoustic guitar, songwriter
 Neil Breytenbach - keyboards, songwriter

Credits
 Theo Crous - Producer
 Kevin "The Caveman" Shirley - Mixer
 Neil Breytenbach - String Arrangements
 Theo Crous - String arrangements (Except "Time Kills Us All")

Reception
Response for the album has been mainly positive. Many praising the impact of the lyrics as well as the maturity of the songs in general. Singles from the record continue to enjoy frequent airplay.

Prime Circle albums
2012 albums